St John's Ward is a ward in the North East Area of Ipswich, Suffolk, England. It returns three councillors to Ipswich Borough Council.

It is designated Middle Layer Super Output Area Ipswich 008 by the Office of National Statistics. It is composed of 6 Lower Layer Super Output Areas.

Notable buildings in St John's Ward
 St Clement's Hospital, Ipswich, a former mental hospital closed in 2002.

References

 
Wards of Ipswich